Happyland is the second studio album by Swedish singer Amanda Jenssen, who finished second in Idol 2007. It was released on October 28, 2009. The first single from the album was the title track "Happyland" and it was released on September 28, 2009 and entered the Swedish Singles Chart at number three.

Track listing

Bonus Tracks

Charts

Weekly charts

Year-end charts

References

2009 albums
Amanda Jenssen albums